The Basrah University College of Science and Technology (Arabic:  كلية البصرة الجامعة للعلوم والتكنولوجيا) is a university college located in south of Iraq Basra, Iraq. It consists of three departments: Information and Communication Engineering, Business Administration and English Department.

References

External links
Official Website 
Official Website 

Basra
Basra
2015 establishments in Iraq